The 1984–85 Oklahoma City Chiefs men's basketball team represented Oklahoma City University in the 1984–85 NCAA Division I men's basketball season as a member of the Midwestern City Conference. They finished the season with a 6–20 overall record, and a 1–13 conference record. They were coached by Abe Lemons in his twentieth season as head coach of the Chiefs. They played their home games at Frederickson Fieldhouse in Oklahoma City, Oklahoma. This was the program's final season in NCAA Division I as OCU moved its athletic programs to the NAIA following the season.

Schedule

|-
!colspan=12 style=| Regular season

|-
!colspan=12 style=|

References

Oklahoma City
Oklahoma City Stars men's basketball seasons
Oklahoma City C
Oklahoma City C